A Jacobi ellipsoid is a triaxial (i.e. scalene) ellipsoid under hydrostatic equilibrium which arises when a self-gravitating, fluid body of uniform density rotates with a constant angular velocity. It is named after the German mathematician Carl Gustav Jacob Jacobi.

History
Before Jacobi, the Maclaurin spheroid, which was formulated in 1742, was considered to be the only type of ellipsoid which can be in equilibrium. Lagrange in 1811 considered the possibility of a tri-axial ellipsoid being in equilibrium, but concluded that the two equatorial axes of the ellipsoid must be equal, leading back to the solution of Maclaurin spheroid. But Jacobi realized that Lagrange's demonstration is a sufficiency condition, but not necessary. He remarked:
"One would make a grave mistake if one supposed that the spheroids of revolution are the only admissible figures of equilibrium even under the restrictive assumption of second degree surfaces" (...) "In fact a simple consideration shows that ellipsoids with three unequal axes can very well be figures of equilibrium; and that one can assume an ellipse of arbitrary shape for the equatorial section and determine the third axis (which is also the least of the three axes) and the angular velocity of rotation such that the ellipsoid is a figure of equilibrium."

Jacobi formula

The integrals can be expressed in terms of incomplete elliptic integrals. In terms of the Carlson symmetric form elliptic integral , the formula for the angular velocity becomes

and the condition on the relative size of the semi-principal axes  is

The angular momentum  of the Jacobi ellipsoid is given by

Relationship with Dedekind ellipsoid

The Jacobi and Dedekind ellipsoids are both equilibrium figures for a body of rotating homogeneous self-gravitating fluid. However, while the Jacobi ellipsoid spins bodily, with no internal flow of the fluid in the rotating frame, the Dedekind ellipsoid maintains a fixed orientation, with the constituent fluid circulating within it. This is a direct consequence of Dedekind's theorem.

For any given Jacobi ellipsoid, there exists a Dedekind ellipsoid with the same semi-principal axes  and same mass and with a flow velocity field of

where  are Cartesian coordinates on axes  aligned respectively with the  axes of the ellipsoid. Here  is the vorticity, which is uniform throughout the spheroid. The angular velocity  of the Jacobi ellipsoid and vorticity of the corresponding Dedekind ellipsoid are related by

That is, each particle of the fluid of the Dedekind ellipsoid describes a similar elliptical circuit in the same period in which the Jacobi spheroid performs one rotation.

In this case , as is always true for a rigidly rotating body.

In the general case, the Jacobi and Dedekind ellipsoids have the same energy, but the angular momentum of the Jacobi spheroid is the greater by a factor of

See also
Maclaurin spheroid
Riemann ellipsoid
Roche ellipsoid
Dirichlet's ellipsoidal problem
Spheroid
Ellipsoid

References

Quadrics
Astrophysics
Fluid dynamics